XHCDS-FM is a radio station on 94.5 FM in Delicias, Chihuahua, Mexico. The station is owned by Promosat Chihuahua and known as Fiesta Mexicana with a grupera format.

History
XHCDS received its concession on October 28, 1994.

References

Radio stations in Chihuahua